Roydon may refer to:

Places

England
Roydon, Essex
Roydon railway station
Roydon Primary School
Roydon United Reformed Church
Roydon, King's Lynn and West Norfolk
Roydon, South Norfolk

Australia
Roydon Island, Tasmania, Australia

Names
Marmaduke Roydon (1583–1646), English merchant-adventurer, colonial planter and Royalist army officer
Mathew Roydon (died 1622), English poet
Roydon Hayes (born 1971), New Zealand cricketer
Matthew Clairmont alias Roydon, character in Shadow of Night
Diana Bishop alias Roydon, character in Shadow of Night

See also
 Royden (disambiguation)